Kharkhar may refer to:
Xarxar, Azerbaijan
Kharkhar, Iran
Kharkhar, Markazi, Iran